Zandra Summer is a Filipina-Austrian actress, who gained media attention through Protégé: The Battle For The Big Artista Break.

Career
Summer auditioned for Protégé: The Battle For The Big Artista Break, where she became the protégé of singer and actress Jolina Magdangal, but, due to the show's twist of event, her mentor Jolina Magdangal had to let her go, and award-winning actress Gina Alajar became her new mentor, and by October 21, 2012, she became one of the runners-up of Protégé: The Battle For The Big Artista Break along with Elle Ramirez, Mikoy Morales, and Ruru Madrid, while Thea Tolentino and Jeric Gonzales was pronounced the ultimate winner of Protégé: The Battle For The Big Artista Break Season 2.

By 2013 Summer was cast in the upcoming fantasy drama of GMA Network called Pyra: Ang Babaeng Apoy together with Thea Tolentino, Jeric Gonzales, Elle Ramirez and veteran actresses Angelu de Leon and Gladys Reyes.

In 2016, she is now a freelance artist signed to VIVA Artists Agency. She is now semi-exclusive in showbiz but is seen in ABS-CBN where she plays minor and recurring roles in many of the teleseryes produced.

Filmography

Television

Film

References

External links

Living people
Year of birth missing (living people)
Filipino television actresses
Filipino people of Austrian descent
Participants in Philippine reality television series
Protégé (TV series) participants
GMA Network personalities
ABS-CBN personalities
TV5 (Philippine TV network) personalities
Viva Artists Agency